Parliamentary elections were held in Iraq on 27 March 2000. The elections were contested by 522 candidates, including 25 women. Whilst there were a number of candidates, all independent candidates were nominally loyal to the Ba'ath Party, and the rest of the candidates were party members.

The Ba'ath Party won 165 of the 250 seats. Of the 85 remaining seats, 55 were independents, and 30 were appointed by the government to represent the northern Kurdish areas of Sulaymaniyah, Erbil and Dohuk, where no elections took place, and which had not been under Iraqi government control since the Gulf War.

Results

References

Elections in Iraq
Iraq
2000 elections in Iraq
March 2000 events in Iraq
Election and referendum articles with incomplete results